Qing Structural Regulations (清式营造则例) is a monograph on Qing dynasty architecture by the Chinese architect Liang Sicheng, first published in 1934.

Liang based his research of Qing dynasty architecture on the 1734 Qing dynasty Architecture Method (Qing Gongcheng Zuofa Zeli 清工程做法则例) of the Qianlong era. He also consulted several craftsmen's manuscripts which had been handed down from generation to generation, and he sought guidance with the palace restoration craftsmen in Beijing. The Forbidden City was the subject of an intense object of study, which he documented with modern drawings and a large number of photographs taken by himself and by his wife. In the end, Liang deciphered a large amount of obscure jargon, making it intelligible to students of architecture, and clarifying the structural characteristics of ancient Chinese architecture.

Since its publication, for more than seven decades, it has become the principal textbook on the essence of ancient Chinese architecture. As Liang put it, this book and Yingzao Fashi are the "two grammar books of Chinese architecture".

Content
Foreword
Preface
Chapter I Introduction (written by Liang's wife Lin Huiyin)
Chapter II Plan: Square, circular, oblong
Chapter III Major Woodwork
 Dougong: column top set, corner set, intermediate set, Hua gong, traverse gong, ang, qiao, sheng, dou, lou-dou fulcrum.
 Timber frame: column, base of column, lintel, sub lintel, rafter, purlin, tie, beam, liang, king post, central column, peripheral column, hypostyle column
Chapter IV  Masonry: stone platform, base, wall; curved roof: overhang gable roof, flush gable roof, gable and hip roof, pyramidal roof, ridge, hip.
Chapter V  Decoration: lattice window, door, ceiling decoration.
Chapter VI Color paint: classification and order: dragon pattern, flower pattern, Suzhou style landscape pattern, story pattern.
Appendices
 Glossary
 Measurements
 Drawings
 Yingzao Suanli (Architecture Material Estimate), distilled from craftsmen's handbooks.
Thirteen Chapters.

1934 non-fiction books
Qing dynasty architecture
Architecture books